The 2016 World University Karate Championships was the 10th edition of World University Karate Championships and took place in Braga, Portugal between August 10 and August 13, 2016.

Medalists

Men

Women

Medal count table

See also 

 World University Championships

References 
 2016 FISU World University Karate Championship - Official Results

2016 in karate
World University Championships
World Karate Championships
Karate competitions in Portugal
International sports competitions hosted by Portugal